Jacob von Sandrart (3 May 1630, Frankfurt am Main — 15 August 1708, Nuremberg) was a German engraver primarily active in Nuremberg.

At age ten Sandrart obtained his artistic training from his better-known uncle Joachim von Sandrart in Amsterdam. After spending time in Danzig and Regensburg, he married Regina Christina Eimart, daughter of the engraver Georg Christoph Eimart the elder, on 10 June 1654. The couple settled in Nuremberg in 1656 and remained there for the rest of their lives. His daughter Susanne Maria von Sandrart was also an artist and engraver.

Sandrart was a very prolific artist; over 400 engravings from his hand are extant. He was best known as a portraitist of prominent contemporary citizens of Nuremberg, as an engraver of maps, and as an illustrator of the literary works of Nuremberg writers, especially Sigmund von Birken. Today Sandrart is best remembered as the founder and first director of the Nuremberg Academy of Fine Arts (est. 1662).

Further reading

External links 
 
 Entry for Jacob von Sandrart on the Union List of Artist Names

References

German engravers
Artists from Frankfurt
1630 births
1708 deaths
Academic staff of the Academy of Fine Arts, Nuremberg
German people of Belgian descent